Valantia muralis is a species of annual herb in the family Rubiaceae. They have a self-supporting growth form and simple, broad leaves. Individuals can grow to 3.2 cm.

Sources

References 

Rubieae
Flora of Malta